Alternation or AlterNation may refer to:

 Alternation (complexity), a resource in computational complexity theory
 Alternation (formal language theory), the set union of two sets of strings in formal language theory and pattern matching
 Alternation (geometry), a geometric operation for deriving polytopes from other polytopes
 Alternation (linguistics), a variation in the phonological form of a morpheme
 Diathesis alternation, a linguistics term relating to verb use
 R/N alternation; see Rhotacism (sound change)
 Logical disjunction, the or function
 AlterNation, a show on NE1 FM
 WSTB, a radio station in Streetsboro, Ohio known as The AlterNation